Pawira Putra (born April 27, 1989 in Pelalawan Regency) is an Indonesian footballer who currently plays for PSPS Pekanbaru in the Indonesia Super League.

Club statistics

References

External links

1989 births
Association football defenders
Living people
Indonesian footballers
Liga 1 (Indonesia) players
PSPS Pekanbaru players
PS Pelalawan players
Sportspeople from Riau
21st-century Indonesian people